Thaumastodermatidae is a family of worms belonging to the order Macrodasyida.

Subfamilies and genera
Subfamilies and genera:
Diplodasyinae Ruppert, 1978
Acanthodasys Remane, 1927
Diplodasys Remane, 1927
Thaumastodermatinae Remane, 1927
Chimaeradasys Kieneke & Todaro, 2020
Hemidasys Claparède, 1867
Oregodasys Hummon, 2008
Pseudostomella Swedmark, 1956
Ptychostomella Remane, 1926
Tetranchyroderma Remane, 1926
Thaumastoderma Remane, 1926

References

Gastrotricha